Cornelius Piong (born 1 July 1949) is a Malaysian prelate of the Catholic Church. He became Bishop of Keningau in 1993.

Early and personal life 
Cornelius was born in Bundu, Kuala Penyu on 1 July 1949. In 1970, he entered St Francis Xavier Major Seminary in Singapore and College General in Penang in 1972. On 27 March 1977, he was ordained priest in his hometown parish by Bishop Simon Michael Fung Kui Heong. In June 1987, he was appointed as vicar general of the Diocese of Kota Kinabalu (now Archdiocese).

On 17 December 1992, Cornelius received his appointment to be the bishop of the newly created Diocese of Keningau. He was ordained bishop on 6 May 1993 at St Francis Xavier's Cathedral, Keningau by Archbishop Peter Chung Hoan Ting.

Cornelius is the first bumiputera Catholic bishop in Malaysia. He is of dusun tatana ethnicity, a bumiputera native to the Malaysian state of Sabah.

Honours 
Cornelius has received the award of the Commander of the Order of Kinabalu (P.G.D.K.) which carries the title "Datuk" from former Sabah Head of State, Sakaran Dandai in 1996.

Honours of Sabah 

 Sabah : Commander of the Order of Kinabalu (P.G.D.K.) (1996)

References

External links 

Catholic-Hierarchy.org 

1949 births
Living people
People from Sabah
20th-century Roman Catholic bishops in Malaysia
21st-century Roman Catholic bishops in Malaysia